Senator Diggs may refer to:

Charles Diggs Sr. (1894–1967), Michigan State Senate
Charles Diggs (1922–1998), Michigan State Senate